The Achievement Stakes was a Canadian Thoroughbred horse race run annually at Woodbine Racetrack in Toronto, Ontario. An allowance race restricted to three-year-old horses foaled in the province of Ontario, it was run on Tapeta synthetic dirt over a distance of six furlongs.

First run as the Achievement Handicap at the Fort Erie Race Track in 1953,  over the years the event was run on both dirt and turf and at a variety of distances: 
  miles on dirt : 1953–1957,  1968-1979 (Fort Erie Race Track)
 1 mile on turf : 1958 (Fort Erie), 1959-1966 (Woodbine Racetrack)
 1 mile on turf : 1967 (Fort Erie)
 7 furlongs on dirt : 1980 (Woodbine Racetrack), 1981-1993 (Greenwood Raceway)
 6 furlongs on dirt : 1994 to 2018 (Woodbine Racetrack)

In 2019, the race was replaced by the Greenwood Stakes.

Records
Speed  record: 
 1:08.33 - Tothemoonandback (2006) (at current distance of six furlongs)

Most wins by an owner:
 5 - Edward P. and/or Winnifred Taylor and/or Windfields Farm (1954, 1955, 1957, 1961, 1979)

Most wins by a jockey:
 6 - Sandy Hawley (1970, 1972, 1973, 1974, 1979, 1990)
 6 - David Clark (1980, 1985, 1998, 2000, 2002, 2008)

Most wins by a trainer:
 5 - Robert Tiller (1975, 2002, 2004, 2017, 2018)

Winners

References

Restricted stakes races in Canada
Woodbine Racetrack
Fort Erie Race Track
1953 establishments in Ontario